Elections to Renfrewshire Council were held on 3 May 2007, the same day as the other Scottish local government elections and the Scottish Parliament general election. The election was the first one using 11 new wards created as a result of the Local Governance (Scotland) Act 2004, each ward will elect three or four councillors using the single transferable vote system form of proportional representation. The new wards replace 40 single-member wards which used the plurality (first past the post) system of election.

Election results

Ward results

Changes since 2007 Election
†On 30 March 2011, Houston, Croslee and Linwood Cllr David Clews quit the Conservative Party and joined the Labour Party.
††In May 2011, Paisley North West Cllr Mike Dillon quit the Liberal Democrats and joined the Scottish National Party. He re-joined the Liberal Democrats on 29 September 2011.
†††On 17 May 2011, Paisley South Cllr Marie McGurk quit the Liberal Democrats and joined the Scottish National Party.

By-elections Since 2007

References

2007
2007 Scottish local elections